Saizana (unvocalized Ge'ez: ሠዐዘነ śʿzn) was the brother of King Ezana of Axum, who changed the official religion of the Axumite Kingdom to Christianity.  That kingdom abutted the Red Sea.

According to the historian Tyrannius Rufinus, he was converted to Christianity with his brother Ezana by the missionary Frumentius. With his brother, he resisted the attempts of the Christian Roman emperor Constantius II to relieve Frumentius of his post as bishop and replace him with an Arian (which was a different sect of Christianity).

Saizana was sent by King Ezana with his other brother Hadefa (alternatively spelled Adiphan, Adefa) to quell an uprising by the Beja. The two brothers were victorious, and six Beja tribes (4400 people) were relocated to a province called Matlia, which is believed to have been situated similarly to the modern province of Begemder in Ethiopia.

He is considered a saint by the Coptic Church, with a feast day of October 1.

References
Holweck, F. G., A Biographical Dictionary of the Saints. St. Louis, MO: B. Herder Book Co. 1924.

4th-century Christian saints
Year of birth missing
Year of death missing
Converts to Christianity from pagan religions
Ethiopian saints
People from the Aksumite Empire